Estádio da Rua Campos Sales was a multi-use stadium in Rio de Janeiro, Brazil. It was initially used as the stadium of America Football Club matches. It was replaced by Estádio Wolney Braune in 1961.  The capacity of the stadium was 25,000 spectators.

References
 Stadium history

Defunct football venues in Brazil
Estadio da Rua Campos Sales
Sports venues completed in 1924